John Paul Ludger Harney, also known as Jean-Paul Harney, (February 2, 1931 – October 4, 2021) was a Canadian professor and former politician.

Academic life

After completing his M.A. at Queen's University in 1961, he became an assistant professor of English at the Ontario Agricultural College in Guelph, Ontario, and taught there until 1966. He was also a poet, and gave readings at the Guelph Public Library. In 1970, he became a humanities professor at York University, and a professor of Canadian studies until 1998.

Political career

Harney ran as a candidate for the New Democratic Party throughout the 1960s, 1970s and 1980s.

From 1962 to 1965, he stood as a candidate for the House of Commons of Canada in Wellington South. After moving to Toronto, he then stood once more as a candidate in Scarborough West in the 1968 federal election. He won a seat in the House of Commons in the 1972 federal election, but was defeated in 1974. He continued to campaign in subsequent elections there up to 1980. In addition, he sought the NDP nomination in the 1978 federal byelection for Broadview, but lost out to Bob Rae.

He was the Provincial Secretary for the Ontario New Democratic Party from 1966 to 1970. In that time, he was also the campaign manager for that party's breakthrough campaign in the 1967 general election.

He campaigned to become national leader at the NDP's 1971 leadership convention, coming in third behind winner David Lewis and runner-up James Laxer. He stood as a candidate again at the 1975 leadership convention, where he got as far as the second ballot, coming in fourth. In 1981, he became involved in party debates concerning the forthcoming adoption of the Canadian Charter of Rights and Freedoms, arguing that it was silent about labour rights to organize, strike and bargain.

Born in Quebec and fluently bilingual, Harney returned to the province and became leader of the Quebec wing of the federal NDP in 1984. He continued to teach at York University, while living in Sillery. He led the relaunching of the New Democratic Party of Quebec as a provincial party in 1985 but was unable to win a seat either in the federal House of Commons (running in Lévis in two elections) or in the Quebec National Assembly (running in Louis-Hébert). During this time, he francized his name to "Jean-Paul".

Late in the 1988 federal election campaign, he called a press conference to support using the notwithstanding clause of the Canadian Constitution to protect Quebec's francophone culture and restrict the use of other languages. This press conference was not endorsed by the NDP leadership, and many believe that it cost the party support among Quebec's anglophones. He stepped down later that year. Although he favoured the Bloc Québécois position on Quebec sovereignty, he refused to consider becoming one of its candidates as long as it pursued independence from Canada.

Harney later retired to Prince Edward County, Ontario, and was involved in promoting local causes. He died in Picton, Ontario on October 4, 2021.

Electoral record

Federal

Wellington South

Scarborough West

Lévis

Québec

Louis-Hébert

|-

|Réjean Doyon
|align="right"|16,913
|align="right"|51.9 
|align="right"|-0.9

|-

|Jean-Paul Harney
|align="right"|2,798
|align="right"|8.6
|align="right"|+8.6
|-

|Claudette J. Hethrington 
|align="right"|287
|align="right"|0.9
|align="right"|+0.9
|-

|Emmanuel Le Brasseur 
|align="right"|252
|align="right"|0.8
|align="right"|+0.8
|-

|Christian Socialist
|Michel Durocher 
|align="right"|58
|align="right"|0.2
|align="right"|+0.2
|-
|}

Notes

References

Bibliography

External links
 
 

1931 births
2021 deaths
Canadian socialists
Members of the House of Commons of Canada from Ontario
New Democratic Party MPs
New Democratic Party of Quebec candidates in Quebec provincial elections
Politicians from Quebec City
Quebec CCF/NDP leaders
Academic staff of York University
Anglophone Quebec people